Janez Kocmur (2 September 1937 – April 2022) was a Yugoslav swimmer. He competed in two events at the 1960 Summer Olympics.

References

External links
 

1937 births
2022 deaths
Slovenian male swimmers
Yugoslav male swimmers
Olympic swimmers of Yugoslavia
Swimmers at the 1960 Summer Olympics
Sportspeople from Maribor
Swimmers at the 1959 Mediterranean Games